Arthur Charles Quam (July 10, 1896 – May 1, 1973), known as Red Quam, was an American football blocking back for the Duluth Eskimos of the National Football League.

References 
 

American football quarterbacks
Duluth Eskimos players
Players of American football from Minneapolis
1896 births
1973 deaths